Warner Bros. Discovery is an American multinational mass media and entertainment conglomerate based in New York City. The company works in the following areas: film, television, cable networks and publishing operations.

The following is a list of major assets that are owned by Warner Bros. Discovery.

Warner Bros. Entertainment 
 Warner Bros. Studio Facilities
 Warner Bros. Museum
 Warner Bros. Studios, Burbank
 Warner Bros. Studios, Leavesden
 Warner Bros. Ranch (sale to Stockbridge Capital Group pending)
 Warner Bros. International Dubbing & Subtitling
 Warner Bros. Digital Networks
 OneFifty
 Uninterrupted (joint venture with LeBron James)
 Ellen Digital Ventures (joint venture with Ellen DeGeneres)
 Sports & Entertainment Digital Network
 WBDGE Digital & Online
 WBDGE Podcast Network
 Private Networks
 iStreamPlanet
 Warner Bros. Theatre Ventures
 DC Studios
 WaterTower Music
 Fandango Media (25%; with NBCUniversal)
 Fandango Movieclips
 Movies.com
 MovieTickets.com
 Rotten Tomatoes
 Fandango Latam
 Vudu
 Turner Entertainment Co.
 Wolper Organization

Warner Bros. Pictures Group 
 Warner Bros. Pictures
 New Line Cinema
 Warner Animation Group
 Castle Rock Entertainment (brand and back library)
 Flagship Entertainment Group (China) (49%) (joint venture with China Media Capital (41%) and TVB (10%))
 Spyglass Media Group (minority stake)
 Warner Bros. Pictures Domestic Distribution (North American exhibition)
 Warner Bros. Pictures Distribution International (international distribution and production; most active in France, Germany, Italy, Spain, the United Kingdom, the Republic of Ireland, Japan, South Korea, Argentina, Brazil and Mexico)

Warner Bros. Television Group 
 Warner Bros. Television Studios
 WBTVS Scripted Production
 Alloy Entertainment
 WBTVS Unscripted Production
 Telepictures
 Telepictures Music
 DC All Access
 True Crime Daily
 A Very Good Production
 Warner Horizon Unscripted Television
 Warner Bros. Television Workshop - the premiere writing program for new writers looking to start and further their career in the world of television. Every year, the Workshop selects up to eight participants out of more than 2,500 submissions and exposes them to Warner Bros. Television's top writers and executives, all with the ultimate goal of earning them a staff position on a Warner Bros.-produced television show. The Warner Bros. Television Writers’ Workshop consists of three components, all geared towards preparing the writer for a successful career in television writing.
 The CW (12.5% each with Paramount Global; 75% with Nexstar Media Group)
 The CW Plus
 CW Seed
 Warner Bros. Animation
 Blue Ribbon Content
 Cartoon Network Studios
 Williams Street
 CN Latin America Original Productions
 Warner Bros. International Television Production
 WBITVP Australia
 WBITVP Belgium
 Eyeworks Belgium Scripted
 BlazHoffski Belgium
 WBITVP Nederland
 BlazHoffski Netherlands
 Kaap Holland Film
 WBITVP New Zealand
 WBITVP Nordics
 LazyTown Entertainment
 WBITVP France
 WBITVP Spain
 WBITVP Portugal
 Warner Bros. Television Studios UK
 Hanna-Barbera Studios Europe
 Renegade Pictures
 Ricochet
 Twenty Twenty Television
 Wall to Wall Media
 All3Media (50%; with Liberty Global)
 All3Media America
 Best Production Company (joint venture with Kevin Bartel)
 Relevé Entertainment
 Woodman Park Productions
 Savage Film (minority stake; Flanders-based film production company)
 All3Media Deutschland
 Tower Productions
 Bon Voyage Films
 Filmpool Entertainment
 Filmpool Fiction
 South & Browse
 The Fiction Syndicate
 All3Media International
 Angelica Films (joint venture with Sally Angel)
 Aurora Media Worldwide
 Bentley Productions Ltd.
 Bright Spot Content
 Bullion Productions
 Caravan
 Company Pictures
 Great Scott Media
 IDTV
 Lime Pictures
 Wise Owl Films
 Lion Television
 Lion Television Scotland
 Lion Television America
 Lion Television International
 Little Dot Studios
 YouTube Channels
 Wing (content agency)
 History Hit (streaming service created by Dan Snow)
 Maverick Television
 Neal Street Productions
 New Pictures
 Witchery Pictures (joint venture with Siobhan Finnigan and Judith King)
 North One Television
 Objective Media Group
 Betty
 Main Event Media
 Objective Fiction
 Tannadice Pictures (joint venture with Neil Forsyth)
 OMG America
 Purple Productions
 Triple Brew Media (live and recorded quiz and gameshow programming)
 OMG Scotland
 Story Films
 Optomen
 Optomen Entertainment
 Raw TV
 Seven Stories
 Silverback Films
 South Pacific Pictures
 Studio Lambert
 Two Brothers Pictures
 Unstoppable Film and TV (run by Noel Clarke and Jason Maza)
 West Road Pictures

Warner Bros. Discovery Networks

The Cartoon Network, Inc.  
 Cartoon Network
 Cartoonito
 Adult Swim
 Toonami
 Boomerang

Factual & Lifestyle Group 
 Discovery Channel
 Discovery en Español
 American Heroes Channel
 Animal Planet
 Discovery Life
 Television Food Network, G.P. (69% with Nexstar Media Group)
 Food Network
 Cooking Channel
 HGTV
 Hogar de HGTV
 TLC
 Science Channel

Entertainment Group 
 Destination America
 Travel Channel
 Investigation Discovery
 Oprah Winfrey Network (95% with Harpo Productions)
 TBS
 TNT
 TruTV
 Turner Classic Movies
 Discovery Family (60% with Hasbro)
 Discovery Familia

Home Box Office, Inc. 
 HBO
 HBO2
 HBO Signature
 HBO Family
 HBO Kids
 HBO Comedy
 HBO Zone
 HBO Latino
 Cinemax
 MoreMax
 ActionMax
 ThrillerMax
 5StarMax
 MovieMax
 Cinemáx (Spanish-language simulcast of primary channel)
 OuterMax
 Magnolia Network (with Chip and Joanna Gaines)
 HBO Films
 HBO Documentary Films

CNN Global  

 CNN
 CNN Business
 HLN
 CNN en Español
 CNN International 
 EMEA
 CNN Türk (50% with Demirören Group)
 CNN Arabic
 CNN Asia-Pacific
 CNN International South Asia
 CNN-News18 (joint venture with Network 18)
CNN Chile 
 Production 
 CNN Films
 Licensed
 A2 CNN (G2 Media)
 Antena 3 CNN (Intact Media Group) 
 CNN Brazil (Novus Media)
 CNN Indonesia (Trans Media)
 CNN Philippines (Nine Media Corporation and Radio Philippines Network)
 CNN Portugal (Media Capital)
 CNN Prima News (FTV Prima)
 N1 (United Group)

Warner Bros. Discovery Sports

Warner Bros. Discovery Sports (United States) 
 AT&T SportsNet
 AT&T SportsNet Pittsburgh
 AT&T SportsNet Rocky Mountain
 AT&T SportsNet Southwest
 Root Sports Northwest (40% with Baseball Club of Seattle, LP)
 MLB Network (16.67% with Major League Baseball, NBC Sports Group, Charter Communications and Cox Communications)
 NBA TV (operations)
 Warner Bros. Discovery Sports Interactive
 NCAA.com (joint venture with the NCAA)
 NBA.com (joint venture with the NBA)
 PGA.com (joint venture with PGA of America)
 Bleacher Report
 House of Highlights
 B/R Live
Motor Trend Group
 Motor Trend
 Hot Rod (magazine)
 Four Wheeler (magazine)
 Motor Trend (magazine)

Warner Bros. Discovery Sports Europe (International) 
 Golf Digest (magazine)
 Eurosport
 Eurosport 1
 Eurosport 2
 Eurosport 2 Xtra (Germany)
 BT Sport (50% with BT Group)
 BT Sport 1
 BT Sport 2
 BT Sport 3
 BT Sport 4
 Global Cycling Network
 GCN+

Warner Bros. Discovery Global Streaming & Interactive Entertainment

Global Streaming 
 HBO Max (would be converted into the new streaming service in 12 April 2023 which would including most, but not all in United States, of the content of Discovery+)
 HBO Go (still exists in certain Asian countries; would be folded into the new streaming service which merging HBO Max and Discovery+)
 Discovery+
 Philo (joint venture with A&E Networks, AMC Networks and Paramount Global)

Warner Bros. Games 
 Avalanche Software
 Monolith Productions
 NetherRealm Studios
 Portkey Games
 Rocksteady Studios
 TT Games
 TT Games Publishing
 TT Fusion
 Traveller's Tales
 TT Odyssey
 WB Games Boston
 WB Games Montréal
 WB Games New York
 WB Games San Diego
 WB Games San Francisco

Otter Media 
 Gunpowder & Sky (joint venture with Van Toffler and Floris Bauer)
 Rooster Teeth
 Rooster Teeth Animation
 Rooster Teeth Games
 Rooster Teeth Studios

Warner Bros. Discovery Global Brands and Experiences 

 Warner Bros. Consumer Products
 Warner Bros. Themed Entertainment
 Warner Bros. Theme Parks
 Parque Warner Madrid (5%)
 Warner Bros. Studio Tours
 Warner Bros. Studio Tour Hollywood
 Warner Bros. Studio Tour London – The Making of Harry Potter
 Discovery Destinations
 Discovery Adventure Parks
 Discovery Destination Hotels
 Discovery at Sea
 Discovery Live Shows & Exhibits
 Discovery Living Words
 Content Distribution
 Worldwide Television Distribution
 Warner Bros. Domestic Television Distribution
 Warner Bros. International Television Distribution
 Home Media Distribution
 Warner Bros. Home Entertainment
 Studio Distribution Services (joint venture with Universal Pictures Home Entertainment)
 HBO label
 TBS label
 TNT label
 TruTV label
 Cartoon Network label
 Adult Swim label
 Discovery label
 Animal Planet label
 Food Network label
 TLC label
 HGTV label
 Warner Bros. Anti-Piracy Operations
 Advertising Sales

Warner Bros. Discovery International 
 The Cartoon Network, Inc. (international channels)
 Cartoon Network
 Cartoonito (brand)
 Adult Swim
 Toonami
 Boomerang
 Entertainment Group (international channels)
 TBS (Latin America)
 TNT
 TruTV
 Turner Classic Movies
 Investigation Discovery
 Travel Channel International
 Factual & Lifestyle Group (international channels)
 Discovery Channel
 Animal Planet
 Discovery Life (Poland)
 Food Network
 Cooking Channel (Canada) (19.8% with Corus Entertainment)
 HGTV
 TLC
 Science Channel (branded as Discovery Science)
 Home Box Office (international channels)
 HBO
 Cinemax
 Magnolia Network (Canada) (19.76% with Corus Entertainment)
 Warner Bros. Discovery Sports (international channels; distribution only)
 Motor Trend (Italia)
 Discovery Turbo
 Discovery Velocity (10% with CTV Specialty Television)
 Warner TV

Asia-Pacific 
 9Rush (joint venture with Nine Entertainment Co.)
 Asian Food Network
 Cartoon Network HD+
 Discovery Asia
 Discovery Kids India
 DMAX (Southeast Asia)
 Eurosport India
 EVE
 JTBC (2.64%)
 Pogo
 Turner Japan
 TABI Channel
 MONDO TV
 World Heritage Channel

New Zealand 
 Bravo (New Zealand) (joint with NBCUniversal International Networks)
 Eden
 Three
 Living
 Rush

Europe, Middle East and Africa 
 Boing
 Boing (Africa)
 Boing (France)
 Boing (Italy) (49% with Mediaset)
 Boing (Spain) (50% with Mediaset España Comunicación)
 DMAX
 DTX
 Fatafeat
 Quest
 Quest Red
 Really
 Tele 5
 Warner Bros. Discovery Italy
 Frisbee
 Giallo
 K2
 Nove
 Real Time
 Warner Bros. Discovery Nordics
 Warner Bros. Discovery Denmark
 6'eren
 Canal 9
 Kanal 4
 Kanal 5 (Denmark)
 Warner Bros. Discovery Finland
 TV5
 Kutonen
 Frii
 Warner Bros. Discovery Norway
 TVNorge Gruppen 
 TVNorge
 FEM
 MAX
 VOX
 Warner Bros. Discovery Sweden
 Kanal 5 (Sweden)
 Kanal 9
 Kanal 11
 Warner TV Networks
 WarnerTV Comedy
 Warner TV France (joint venture with Canal+ Group)
 WarnerTV Film
 WarnerTV Serie

Poland 
 TVN Group
 TVN
 TVN 7
 TVN24
 TVN24 BiS
 TVN Fabula
 TVN International
 TVN International Extra
 TVN Style
 TVN Turbo
 TTV
 Canal+ Poland (32%; with Canal+ Group and Liberty Global)
 Discovery Historia
 Metro

Americas 
 Discovery Home & Health
 Discovery Kids Latin America
Redknot (joint venture with Nelvana)
 Discovery Theater
 Discovery World (Latin America)
 Glitz
 Golf Channel Latin America
 HTV
 I.Sat
 MuchMusic
 Raze
 Space
 TNT Series
 TNT Sports (Argentina)
 TNT Sports (Brazil)
 Estádio TNT Sports
 TNT Sports (Chile)
 TNT Sports HD
 TNT Sports 2
 TNT Sports 3
 Estadio TNT Sports
 TNT Sports (México)
 Tooncast

DC Entertainment 
 MAD
 DC Comics
 DC Black Label
 DC's Young Animal
 WildStorm
 Sandman Universe
 Hill House Comics
 Wonder Comics
 DC Graphic Novels for Kids
 DC Graphic Novels for Young Adults
 DC Universe Infinite

Former assets

Divested 
 AOL - spun-off in 2009 and acquired by Verizon Communications in 2015, thus operating under the latter's media division from 2017 to 2021. AOL is now owned by Apollo Global Management. (through 90% of Yahoo! Inc.)
 Atari, Inc. - sold to Jack Tramiel on July 1, 1984, for 50 dollars cash and 240 million in stock and notes.
 ACC Select
 Atlanta Braves - Transferred to Liberty Media in exchange for 60 million shares of Time Warner stock (valued at $1.27 billion) held by Liberty Media.
 Atlanta Hawks
 Atlanta Thrashers
 Bad Wolf - minority stake; sold to Sony Pictures Television in 2021.
 BET Holdings, Inc. - 15% with Robert Johnson, BET executives and shareholders, Taft Television & Radio Company and Liberty Media/Tele-Communications, Inc., sold its stake in 1996; currently owned by Paramount Global through its Media Networks division.
 BET Action Pay-Per-View - purchased by TVN Entertainment Corp. in 2001
 BET on Jazz
 Central European Media Enterprises - 75% equity holding; sold to PPF in August 2020.
 Chilevisión - sold to Paramount Networks Americas in 2021.
 College Television Network
 Comedy Central (50% with Viacom) - sold its stake in 2003; currently owned by Paramount Global.
 CourtTV - brand name and pre-2008 original programming library acquired by Katz Broadcasting/E. W. Scripps Company in December 2018.
 Crunchyroll - sold to Sony's joint venture anime division Funimation, run by Sony Pictures and Sony Music Entertainment (Japan)'s Aniplex, in 2021; the merged company was branded entirely as Crunchyroll in 2022.
 VRV - included in the sale and also folded into Crunchyroll
 Discovery Digital Networks - sold to Group Nine Media in 2016
 Discovery Education - majority stake sold to Francisco Partners in 2018 and Clearlake Capital in 2022
 E! - Time Warner's stake acquired by Comcast and The Walt Disney Company in 1997.
 Game Show Network, LLC — 42% stake acquired by co-owner Sony Pictures Television in 2019.
 GameTap - sold to Metaboli in 2008, later closed in 2010.
 Great American Country - sold to GAC Media in 2021 and rebranded as GAC Family
 Hello Sunshine (joint venture with Reese Witherspoon, Seth Rodsky and Emerson Creative) - sold
 HowStuffWorks - sold to Blucora in 2018
 Hulu (10% stake) - sold to Hulu LLC, but was allocated between The Walt Disney Company (7%) and Comcast (3%); Disney acquired majority interest (67%) of Hulu, with Comcast as minority partner (33%), in 2019.
 Metro-Goldwyn-Mayer - between 1967 and 1969 was owned by Time Inc. as a shareholder; briefly owned by Turner Broadcasting System in 1986; sold back to Kirk Kerkorian later that year and currently owned by Amazon (through MGM Holdings), while the pre-May 1986 library was retained by Turner Entertainment Co.
 National Kinney Corporation - spun-off in 1978 and renamed as Andal Corporation
 New York Cosmos
 Particular Crowd - spun-off in 2023.
 Panavision
 Pittsburgh Pirates (48% with John W. Galbreath)
 Playdemic - sold to Electronic Arts in 2021
 PlayON! Sports Network
 Sea World (Gold Coast) - 50% stake bought out by Village Roadshow Theme Parks in 2006 along with Wet 'N' Wild Gold Coast and Warner Bros Movie World.
 Six Flags - acquired by Premier Parks in 1998.
 The Smoking Gun
 SportSouth - acquired by Fox Cable Networks in 1996 and relaunched as Fox Sports South.
 Time Inc. - spun-off in 2014, then acquired by Meredith Corporation in 2018, and later acquired by IAC's Dotdash in 2021.
 IPC Media
 Time4 Media - formerly Times Mirror magazines group purchased from Tribune Company, sold to Bonnier Group & World Publications
 Transworld Magazine Corporation
 Popular Science
 Marine Group
 Time4Outdoors
 Mountain Sports Media
 The Parenting Group Inc. - Time, Inc. magazine group; sold to Bonnier and World Publications
 Family Life - sold to Time Warner in 1999; closed down in 2001
 Time Life
 Time-Life Films - sold to Columbia Pictures Television in 1981; library currently owned by HBO.
 Talent Associates
 Time–Life Records
 Time Warner Book Group - sold to Hachette Livre in 2006
 Time Warner Cable - spun-off in 2009 and has been acquired by Charter Communications in 2016.
 TMZ - sold to Fox Corporation in 2021.
 TT Centroid - moved to Pinewood Studios and spun off in 2008
 TriStar Pictures - joint venture with CBS and Columbia Pictures. In December 1986, HBO sold TriStar to Columbia Pictures.
 truTV UK and Ireland
 Turner South - acquired by Fox Cable Networks in 2006 and relaunched as SportSouth.
 TW Telecom - spun off in 1998, acquired by Level 3 Communications Inc. in 2014
 Warner-Amex Satellite Entertainment (Joint venture with American Express; became MTV Networks.) - sold to Viacom in 1986
 Cable Music Channel - sold by Turner to Warner-Amex, then closed down and replaced with VH1
 Warner Bros. Movie World Gold Coast - 50% stake in the park bought out by Village Roadshow Theme Parks in 2006 along with Wet 'n' Wild Gold Coast and Sea World.
 Warner Bros. Movie World Germany
 Warner Music Group - spun-off in 2004, then acquired by Access Industries in 2011, and later spun-off again into an IPO in 2020
 Warner Advanced Media Operations - acquired by Cinram International in 2003
 WEA Manufacturing - acquired by Cinram International in 2003
 Wet'n'Wild Water World 50% in the park bought out by Village Roadshow Theme Parks in 2006 along with Warner Bros. Movie World and Sea World.
 WPCH-TV - sold to Meredith Corporation in 2017 and later acquired by Gray Television in 2021.

Dormant or shuttered 
These are Warner Bros. Discovery divisions which have been closed or folded into another part of the company.

 3net - 3D television channel jointly owned with Sony and IMAX Corporation; operated from 2011 to 2014
 7food network
 Adult Swim Games
 Big Pixel Studios
 AIMS Multimedia - acquired by Discovery Education in 2004
 Altschul Group Corporation - acquired by Discovery Education in 2003
 FilmFair Communications
 Animal Planet Italy
 Associated Artists Productions - bought 1933–1957 Fleischer/Famous Studios Popeye cartoons and pre-1950 WB library in 1956; the latter library would find its way back to Warner ownership in 1996 as part of the Turner merger (which also incorporated the Popeye cartoons)
 Bamzu.com
 Beme Inc. - merged into CNN Digital Studios in 2018
 Boomerang Germany - closed in 2018 and replaced by Boomerang CEE with German advertisements.
 Boomerang (Latin America) - closed in 2021 and replaced by Cartoonito (Latin America)
 Brut Productions - acquired by Turner Broadcasting System from Faberge Inc. in 1982; library currently owned by Turner Entertainment Co.
 C4
 California Video Center
 Canal 8 Sport
 Cartoonito (Spain)
 Cartoon Network (Spain) - Shut down in 2013 and replaced by the Spanish version of Boing
 Cartoon Network Too
 Castle Rock Television - Folded into Warner Bros. Television
 China Entertainment Television - 36% stake held by Turner Broadcasting System; ceased broadcasting in 2016
 Chuck Jones Enterprises - Folded into Warner Bros. Animation
 Clearvue & SVE - acquired by Discovery Education in 2006
 CNN Airport
 CNN Checkout Channel
 CNNfn
 CNN Pipeline
 CNN/SI
 CNN+ (in conjunction with CNN Global) - second incarnation; shut down on April 28, 2022
 CNN+ (Spanish TV network) - first incarnation; joint venture with Sogecable
 CNN Money Switzerland - joint venture with MediaGo
 Cartoon Network Extreme (CNX)
 Crime Library
 DC Vertigo
 DC Universe (SVOD) - shut down with catalog absorbed into HBO Max and spun off into DC Universe Infinite on January 21, 2021
 Discovery Channel Multimedia
 Discovery Channel Radio
 Discovery Channel Romania
 Discovery Civilization
 Discovery Family (France) - shut down in 2022
 Discovery Family Go - shut down on May 2, 2022
 Discovery Films - library currently owned by Warner Bros.
 Discovery Geschichte
 Discovery Health Channel
 Discovery Home & Health Southeast Asia
 Discovery Home & Health UK
 Discovery Kids Australia
 Discovery Kids UK
 Discovery People
 Discovery Real Time
 Discovery Real Time France
 Discovery Shed
 Discovery Travel & Living
 Discovery Wings
 Discovery World Europe
 DKids
 DMAX MENA
 Dplay - replaced in available regions by Discovery+
 DramaFever - shut down in 2018
 eleveneleven
 Esporte Interativo - TV channels shut down in 2018; brand replaced by TNT Sports in 2021
 Eurosport 360°
 Eurosport 2 Xtra (Portugal)
 Eurosport News
 Eurosport Player - replaced in available regions by Discovery+
 Eurosport Pluss
 FandangoNOW
 Festival
 FilmBuff
 FilmStruck - shut down in 2018
 Fine Living Europe
 Fine Living Italy
 First National Pictures - acquired by Warner Bros. in 1928 and closed in 1936
 FitTV
 Food Network (New Zealand)
 Four
 Fullscreen, Inc. - team laid off and company absorbed into WBD Ad Sales 
 McBeard
 Reelio
 Global Digital Media Xchange
 Golf World (magazine)
 GolfTV (dissolved into Discovery+ in 2022)
 Good Food
 Great Big Story - shut down in 2020
 GXT
 Hanna-Barbera - absorbed into Warner Bros. Animation
 Hanna-Barbera Home Video
 Hanna-Barbera Poland
 HBO Animation
 HBO Defined (India)
 HBO Now - replaced/dissolved by HBO Max
 HBO Downtown Productions — dissolved in 2001; pre-1992 library owned by HBO
 HBO Hits (India)
 HBO Independent Productions
 HBO Netherlands - joint venture with Ziggo
 HBO Go - replaced by HBO Max in the United States, Latin America, Nordics, Spain, Portugal, Central and Eastern Europe, still active in Asian countries, would be folded into the new streaming service which merging HBO Max and Discovery+
 HBO Nordic
 HBO Portugal
 HBO España
 HBO NYC Productions (formerly called HBO Showcase) - folded into HBO Films
 HBO Home Entertainment - transferred and folded into Warner Bros. Home Entertainment in 2019
 HBO Latin America Group - transferred and folded into Warner Bros. Discovery Latin America Group 
 Headstrong Pictures
 HOOQ (streaming service joint venture with Sony Pictures Entertainment and Singtel) - shut down on 30 April 2020 due to liquidation and eventually sold to Coupang in July 2020 to form the nucleus of its streaming service named Coupang Play
 Lorimar Film Entertainment
 Monogram Pictures/Allied Artists Pictures Corporation - sold to Lorimar in 1979; post-August 17, 1946 library currently owned by Warner Bros. Entertainment
 Interstate Television - founded in early 1950s as the TV arm of Allied Artists, became Allied Artists Television in 1960s and was folded into Lorimar with the rest of AAPC in 1979
 Lorimar Home Video - folded into Warner Home Video in 1988
 Lorimar Records
 Lorimar Television
 Rankin/Bass Productions - post-1974 library currently owned by Warner Bros.
 ZIV International - acquired by Lorimar Productions in 1982; the library contents were sold to Coral Pictures in 1986.
 Machinima, Inc. - merged into Fullscreen in 2019
 Midway Games - shut down under bankruptcy in 2009
 Atari Games
 Time Warner Interactive
 Momlogic
 Mondo Mah-jong TV - ceased broadcasting on March 31, 2022, due to the closure of the platform that carried the channel.
 National General Pictures - sold to Warner Bros. in 1973
 Nelson Entertainment - acquired by New Line Cinema in 1991; library currently owned by Metro-Goldwyn-Mayer
 Embassy Home Entertainment - former divisions of its sister company, Embassy Pictures
 Galactic Films, Inc.
 Spikings Corporation
 Charter Entertainment
 New Line Home Entertainment - Folded into Warner Home Video
 New Line Television - Folded into Warner Bros. Television
 New Line Television Pay-Per-View - Folded into Warner Bros. Television Distribution
 Oh!K
 Outright Distribution
 People's Court Raw
 Picturehouse - renamed from Fine Line Features in 2005, then closed in 2008; reopened in 2013 as an independent studio
 Prime Time Entertainment Network
 Quest Arabiya
 Quibi - Minority stake; shut down.
 Red by HBO (24/7 Asian cinema channel; joint venture with Mei Ah Entertainment) - ceased broadcasting on July 1, 2021
 Setanta Sports Asia
 Seven Arts Productions
 Shed Productions - folded into Wall to Wall
 Snowblind Studios - merged into Monolith Productions in 2012
 Stage 13 - closed in 2022.
 Studio T - combined brand name for TBS Productions and TNT Productions; dissolved in 2019
 Super Deluxe
 ThreeLife
 Tabi Tele - ceased broadcasting on March 31, 2022, due to the closure of the platform that carried the channel.
 Take 2
 Toonami (channels in India, Southeast Asia, and UK & Ireland)
 TNT Sweden - closed in 2019
 Turner Broadcasting System - closed in 2019
 Turner Broadcasting System Latin America
 Turner International Argentina
 Turner Classic Movies 2
 Turner Classic Movies (Asia)
 Turner Classic Movies (Northern Europe)
 Turner Home Entertainment - folded into Warner Home Video as an in-name-only unit in December 1996
 Turner Pictures
 Turner Program Services - folded into Warner Bros. Television Distribution
 Vivolta (20% stake)
 Warner Bros. Domestic Pay TV, Cable & Network Features - a former division of Warner Bros. Domestic Television Distribution that licensed Warner Bros. feature films, television series, miniseries, TV films, and specials to the pay television and basic cable markets, as well as feature films to the broadcast networks. Formed in 1994, It was re-organized in 2001 as “Warner Bros. Domestic Cable Distribution”, before folding into Warner Bros. Domestic Television Distribution in 2008
 Warner Bros. Family Entertainment - closed in 2009
 Warner Bros. Feature Animation
 Warner Bros. Global Kids, Young Adults and Classics - closed in 2022
 Warner Bros. Jungle Habitat
 Warner Bros. Studio Store
 WB Channel
 Watershed Television
 Warner Horizon Scripted Television - merged into Warner Bros. Television Studios in 2020
 WarnerMax - short-lived film production company joint venture Warner Bros. and HBO Max, it closed down in October 2020
 Warner Independent Pictures - closed in 2008
 Warner Premiere - closed in 2012
 Warner Alliance - a now-defunct contemporary Christian music division owned by Warner Music Group, which operated until 1998. The company was dissolved by Warner purchasing Word Entertainment.
 Warner Resound - a now-defunct Christian division of Warner Music Group, focused on distributing Christian music and media, as well as products from other artists like Vigilantes of Love and The Call. The company largely became dormant after Word Entertainment was sold to Warner Music Group.
 Weintraub Entertainment Group - 15% stake previously held by Columbia Pictures
 The WB - 64% joint venture with Tribune Broadcasting; closed in 2006.
 World Championship Wrestling (WCW) - video library, selected wrestler contracts and other intellectual property sold to World Wrestling Federation Entertainment, Inc., now known as WWE (World Wrestling Entertainment), through its subsidiary W. Acquisition Company (which was subsequently renamed WCW Inc. following the sale) in 2001.
 Yalli Productions

See also 
 Lists of corporate assets
 List of libraries owned by Warner Bros. Discovery

References 

Assets
Warner Bros. Discovery
Warner Bros. Discovery